Karpathos or Carpathus was a city of ancient Greece on the island of Karpathos. Its harbour was Poseidium, and the city was located at modern Aperi.

References

Populated places in the ancient Aegean islands
Former populated places in Greece